Vadym Yuriyovych Yavorskyi (born 26 June 1994) is a Ukrainian professional footballer who plays as a striker for Polish club Cosmos Nowotaniec.

Career
Yavorskyi is product of youth team systems of FC Chornomorets. Made his debut for FC Chornomorets in game against FC Shakhtar Donetsk on 13 September 2014 in the Ukrainian Premier League.

References

External links
 
 

1994 births
Living people
Footballers from Odesa
Ukrainian footballers
Association football forwards
FC Chornomorets Odesa players
FC Chornomorets-2 Odesa players
SC Odesa players
FC Kryvbas Kryvyi Rih players
FC Hirnyk-Sport Horishni Plavni players
NK Veres Rivne players
MFC Mykolaiv players
MFC Mykolaiv-2 players
PFC Sumy players
SC Dnipro-1 players
FC Kramatorsk players
Ukrainian Premier League players
Ukrainian First League players
Ukrainian Second League players
Ukrainian Amateur Football Championship players
Ukrainian expatriate footballers
Expatriate footballers in Poland
Ukrainian expatriate sportspeople in Poland